The men's team table tennis event at the 2015 Pan American Games will be held between the 19 and 21 of July at the Atos Markham Pan Am Centre in Toronto, Canada.

Schedule
All times are Central Standard Time (UTC-6).

Results

Round Robin
The round robin will be used as a qualification round. The twelve teams will be split into groups of three. The top two teams from each group will advance to the first round of playoffs.

Group A

Group B

Group C

Group D

Playoffs

Final classification

References

Table tennis at the 2015 Pan American Games